East Berwick is a census-designated place (CDP) in Salem Township, Luzerne County, Pennsylvania, United States. The population was 2,007 at the 2010 census.

Geography

East Berwick is located along the Susquehanna River at  (41.062789, -76.224529). East Berwick borders Berwick Borough, which is in neighboring Columbia County. The CDP is also adjacent to Nescopeck Borough, which is on the opposite bank of the Susquehanna River.

Demographics

At the 2000 census there were 1,998 people, 846 households, and 611 families living in the CDP. The population density was 2,308.0 people per square mile (886.7/km2). There were 878 housing units at an average density of 1,014.2/sq mi (389.7/km2).  The racial makeup of the CDP was 98.25% White, 0.60% African American, 0.50% Asian, 0.20% from other races, and 0.45% from two or more races. Hispanic or Latino of any race were 0.85%.

There were 846 households, 26.0% had children under the age of 18 living with them, 60.4% were married couples living together, 9.0% had a female householder with no husband present, and 27.7% were non-families. 25.2% of households were made up of individuals, and 15.5% were one person aged 65 or older. The average household size was 2.36 and the average family size was 2.79.

The age distribution was 20.4% under the age of 18, 6.1% from 18 to 24, 23.5% from 25 to 44, 25.8% from 45 to 64, and 24.1% 65 or older. The median age was 45 years. For every 100 females, there were 91.0 males. For every 100 females age 18 and over, there were 87.3 males.

The median household income was $40,489 and the median family income  was $46,458. Males had a median income of $30,887 versus $27,813 for females. The per capita income for the CDP was $19,531. About 4.3% of families and 5.4% of the population were below the poverty line, including 15.8% of those under age 18 and 1.9% of those age 65 or over.

References

Census-designated places in Luzerne County, Pennsylvania
Census-designated places in Pennsylvania